By Any Means Necessary is the third album by saxophonist Gary Thomas recorded in 1989 and released on the JMT label.

Reception
The AllMusic review by Scott Yanow states, "The music features dense ensembles, simultaneous improvisations, eccentric funk rhythms, and rhythmic but very dissonant horn solos that have a logic of their own. One can think of this noisy date as being an updated extension of Ornette Coleman's Prime Time and is recommended to open-minded listeners who think that nothing new has been played in jazz since the mid-'70s."

Track listing
All compositions by Gary Thomas except as indicated
 "By Any Means Necessary" - 7:44	
 "Continuum" - 6:52	
 "You're Under Arrest" (John Scofield) - 7:17	
 "Potential Hazard" - 6:23	
 "To the Vanishing Point" - 4:37	
 "Screen Gem" - 5:02
 "Janala" (Geri Allen, Greg Osby, Gary Thomas, Naná Vasconcelos) - 2:39	
 "At Risk" - 7:12	
 "Out of Harm's Way" - 6:12

Personnel
Gary Thomas  - tenor saxophone, flute synthesizer
Greg Osby - alto saxophone, synthesizer (tracks 7 & 9) 
Mick Goodrick (tracks 6 & 8), John Scofield (tracks 1, 3 & 8) - guitar
Geri Allen, (tracks 4, 5 & 7), Tim Murphy (tracks 1–6, 8 & 9)  - piano, synthesizer
Anthony Cox - bass (tracks 1–6, 8 & 9)
Dennis Chambers - drums (tracks 1–6, 8 & 9)
Naná Vasconcelos - percussion (tracks 1, 2, 4-6 & 8)

References 

1989 albums
Gary Thomas (musician) albums
JMT Records albums
Winter & Winter Records albums